Ben E. Compton was a college football player.

University of Alabama
He was a prominent guard for the Alabama Crimson Tide football team of the University of Alabama from 1922 to 1924, playing opposite Bill Buckler. Compton also kicked.

1924
Compton was a member of the 1924 Southern Conference champion, playing opposite Bill Buckler. He was selected All-Southern on the second of two composite All-Southern selections.

References

1946 deaths
People from Greensboro, Alabama
American football guards
Alabama Crimson Tide football players
Players of American football from Alabama
American football placekickers
All-Southern college football players